Janków Przygodzki  is a village in the administrative district of Gmina Przygodzice, within Ostrów Wielkopolski County, Greater Poland Voivodeship, in west-central Poland. The village has a population of 1,707.

On 14 November 2013, a gas pipeline explosion damaged several houses in the village. The blast killed two people and injured thirteen.

References

Villages in Ostrów Wielkopolski County